Saint-Cyprien may refer to the following places:

Canada

 Saint-Cyprien, Bas-Saint-Laurent, Quebec, municipality in Bas-Saint-Laurent, Quebec
 Saint-Cyprien, Chaudière-Appalaches, Quebec, parish in Chaudière-Appalaches, Quebec
 Saint-Cyprien-de-Napierville, Quebec, municipality in Quebec

France

 Saint-Cyprien, Corrèze, in the Corrèze department
 Saint-Cyprien, Dordogne, in the Dordogne department
 Saint-Cyprien, Loire, in the Loire department
 Saint-Cyprien, Lot, in the Lot department
 Saint-Cyprien, Pyrénées-Orientales, in the Pyrénées-Orientales department
 Saint-Cyprien-sur-Dourdou, in the Aveyron department

Other uses 
 Saint-Cyprien XIII, a French former rugby league club, since 2002 absorbed into Saint-Esteve XIII Catalan

See also
 Saint Cyprian (disambiguation)